The Violet Stakes is an American Thoroughbred horse race held annually at Monmouth Park Racetrack in Oceanport, New Jersey. Inaugurated in 1977, the current Listed race is open to fillies and mares age three and older and is raced on turf over a distance of  miles (8.5 furlongs). First run at Meadowlands Racetrack in East Rutherford, New Jersey, it had its final running there in 2009. Not run in 2010, it was picked up by the Monmouth Park track in 2011 and as such was able to maintain its Grade 3 status.

Historical notes
The event was run as the Violet Handicap until 2004. The inaugural running took place on September 4, 1977 at Meadowlands Racetrack on a rainy day that resulted in a sloppy track. The race was won by Lady Singer who was ridden by future U.S. Racing Hall of Fame jockey Angel Cordero Jr. for owner Walter Haefner and trainer Victor Nickerson. Haefner and Nickerson would get their second Violet Handicap win in 1985 with Vers La Caisse.

The Violet Stakes was raced on dirt in 1977, 1993, 1999, 2006 and was run in two divisions in 1980, 1982 through 1985, 1987 and 1988. It was due to safety concerns as a result of wet weather conditions that the 2006 race was switched from the turf course to the dirt track. On this occasion, the Violet Stakes was not given a grade.

The Very One, winner of the 1980 Violet Handicap, had The Very One Stakes at Pimlico and The Very One Stakes at Gulfstream Park named in her honor. 

Gather The Clan's winning time in the 1989 race was just one-fifth of a second off the Meadowlands course record set on September 30, 1988 by Wanderkin.

Records
Speed  record:
 1:39.60 – Gather The Clan (1989)

Most wins:
 2 – Humoristic (2005, 2007)

Most wins by a jockey:
 5 – Jean-Luc Samyn (1981, 1982, 1983, 1985, 1987)

Most wins by a trainer:
 3 – Philip G. Johnson (1983, 1985, 1987)
 3 – Barclay Tagg (1990, 1992, 2004)
 3 – Christophe Clement (1998, 2011, 2012)
 3 – Chad Brown (2016, 2018, 2020)

Most wins by an owner:
 2 – Walter Haefner (1977, 1985)
 2 – Edward P. Evans (1985, 1987)
 2 – Bonner Farm (1990, 1992)
 2 – Erdenheim Farm (1996, 1997)
 2 – Mrs. Arturo Peralta-Ramos (2005, 2007)

Winners

 † switched from turf to dirt, no grade allocated.

References

Mile category horse races for fillies and mares
Ungraded stakes races in the United States
Turf races in the United States
Recurring sporting events established in 1997
Monmouth Park Racetrack
Meadowlands Racetrack